Fury or FURY may refer to:

Arts, entertainment, and media

Comics
 Fury (2001 series)

Fictional entities
 Fury (DC Comics), the name of three characters
 Fury (Marvel Comics), an android
 Fury, in Power Rangers Dino Charge and Power Rangers Dino Super Charge

Films
 Fury (1923 film), an American silent film 
 Fury (1936 film), an American drama 
 Fury (1947 film), an Italian drama
 Fury (1948 film), an American film, also known as Thunderhoof and Wild Fury
 The Fury (film), a 1978 horror thriller by Brian De Palma
 Fury (2012 film), British title of The Samaritan
 Fury (2014 film), a 2014 war film by David Ayer
 Fury: Original Motion Picture Soundtrack
 The Fury (2016 film), a Dutch film based on a novel by A.F.Th. van der Heijden

Gaming
 Fury (video game), an online role-playing game
 The Fury (video game), a racing game
 The Fury, a character from Metal Gear Solid 3: Snake Eater
 Fury, a (female only) character profession in the game Shadowbane

Literature
 Fury, a 1947 novel by Henry Kuttner
 The Fury (Timms novel), 1954
 The Fury (Farris novel), 1976
 Fury (Rushdie novel), 2001
 Fury (Star Wars novel), 2007

Music
 Fury (Australian band), a thrash metal band 
 Fury (American band), a hardcore punk band
 Fury Records, an American record label
 Fury UK, a British heavy metal band 
 Fury (Sick Puppies album), 2016
 Fury (Stefano Lentini album), 2018
 The Fury (album), a 1985 album by Gary Numan
 "Fury" (song), by Prince, 2006
 "Fury", a bonus track by Muse from the album Absolution, 2003

Other uses in arts, entertainment, and media
 "Fury" (Star Trek: Voyager), an episode of the TV series
 Fury (American TV series), a 1950s American western series
 Fury (Russian TV series), an upcoming Russian TV series

People
 Fury (surname), including a list of people with the name
 Fury (DJ), Steve Blakley an American DJ

Places
 Fury Island (Ottawa), an island of Ontario, Canada
 Hecla and Fury Islands, Nunavut, Canada
 Fury Island, Bárbara Channel, Chile
 Fury Island County Park, a park in Minnesota, U.S.
 Mount Fury, Washington, U.S.

Sport

Australia
 Kemblawarra Fury FC, a New South Wales football club
 Northern Fury FC, a Queensland soccer club
 Western Fury, a women's cricket team

Canada
 Fury Stakes, a Thoroughbred horse race Toronto
 Ontario Fury, an indoor soccer team
 Ottawa Fury (2005–13), a soccer team
 Ottawa Fury FC, a soccer team 2014–2019
 Prince George Fury, a soccer team 2009–2010
 Whitby Fury, an ice hockey team
 Winnipeg Fury, a soccer team

United States
 Corpus Christi Fury, an indoor football team
 Detroit Fury, an arena football team 
 Fort Wayne Fury, a basketball team 
 Long Island Fury, a women's soccer team
 Miami Fury, a women's American football team
 Muskegon Fury, later Muskegon Lumberjacks, an ice hockey team
 Philadelphia Fury, a soccer team
 Philadelphia Fury (1978–1980)
 Rockford Fury, a basketball team

Elsewhere
 Monterrey Fury, a Mexican soccer team

Transportation and military

Aircraft
 Felixstowe Fury, a British triplane flying-boat
 Hawker Fury, a 1930s British biplane fighter
 Hawker Sea Fury, initially called Fury, a post-War British fighter aircraft
 North American FJ-1 Fury, a 1940s U.S. Navy straight-wing jet aircraft
 North American FJ-2/-3 Fury, 1950s U.S. Navy and Marine Corps swept-wing jet aircraft
 North American FJ-4 Fury, a 1950s/60s U.S. Navy and Marine Corps fighter-bomber
 LoPresti Fury, a 1980s American sports plane

Motor vehicles
 BSA Fury, a British prototype motorcycle
 Honda Fury, a motorcycle
 Plymouth Fury, an American car
 Royal Enfield Fury, the name of several motorcycles
 Sylva Fury, a British kit car

Rail
 LMS 6399 Fury, an experimental steam locomotive

Ships
 HMS Fury, the name of several Royal Navy ships 
 USS Fury, the name of two U.S. Navy ships

Weaponry
 .277 Fury, a rifle cartridge introduced by SIG Sauer

Other uses
 Fury (roller coaster), in Bobbejaanland, Belgium
 Fury 325, a roller coaster in Carowinds amusement park, U.S.
 Fellowship of United Reformed Youth (FURY), a church youth organization
 Furies or Erinyes, figures in Greek mythology
 Rage (emotion), or fury

See also

 Furia (disambiguation)
 Furie (disambiguation)
 Furies (disambiguation)
 Furio (disambiguation)
 Furiosa (disambiguation)
 Furioso (disambiguation)
 Furious (disambiguation)
 Furry (disambiguation)
 Furey, a surname
 The Furys (disambiguation)
 Fury3, a 1996 video game